The Parish Church of the Assumption of Mary is a Baroque Roman Catholic parish church located in the village of Għaxaq, Malta.

History
Records show that since 1511, a church dedicated to the Assumption of Mary stood where the current church stands today. When Għaxaq became an independent parish in 1626, the church became the parish church. The church was modified and enlarged multiple times, notably in 1655. Nonetheless, a new Baroque church was built instead between 1723 and 1760. The new church was consecrated on May 2, 1784.

Interior
The church includes a number of artifacts, amongst these the titular statue of the Blessed Virgin, carved in wood by Mariano Gerada in 1808. Another statue which could be found in this church is that of Saint Joseph which was made by Fratelli Bertarelli of Milan in Italy in the year 1932 and is also carved in wood. The paintings which decorate the church's ceiling were painted by Emvin Cremona during the 1960s while other works of art date back to the 16th, 17th and 18th centuries mostly painted by famous Maltese artists: Gio Nicola Buhagiar, Francesco Zahra, Rokku Buhagiar and Gianni Vella among others.

References

External links

18th-century Roman Catholic church buildings in Malta
Għaxaq
Baroque church buildings in Malta
Religious organizations established in 1625
Roman Catholic churches completed in 1760